Solar wind Magnetosphere Ionosphere Link Explorer (SMILE) is a planned joint venture mission between the European Space Agency and the Chinese Academy of Sciences. SMILE will image for the first time the magnetosphere of the Sun in soft X-rays and UV during up to 40 hours per orbit, improving our understanding of the dynamic interaction between the solar wind and Earth's magnetosphere. The prime science questions of the SMILE mission are
 What are the fundamental modes of the dayside solar wind/magnetosphere interaction?
 What defines the substorm cycle?
 How do coronal mass ejection-driven storms arise and what is their relationship to substorms?
As of February 2023, SMILE is expected to launch in April 2025.

Overview 
The mission will observe the solar wind interaction with the magnetosphere with its X-ray and ultraviolet cameras (SXI and UVI), gathering simultaneous images and videos of the dayside magnetopause (where Earth's magnetosphere meets the solar wind), the polar cusps (a region in each hemisphere where particles from the solar wind have direct access to Earth's ionosphere), and the auroral oval (the region around each geomagnetic pole where auroras most often occur). SMILE will also gather simultaneously in situ measurements with its two other instruments making up its payload – an ion analyser (LIA) and a magnetometer (MAG). These instruments will monitor the ions in the solar wind, magnetosheath and magnetosphere while detecting changes in the local DC magnetic field.

SMILE must reach a high enough altitude to view the outside edge of Earth's magnetopause and at the same time obtain good spatial resolution of the auroral oval. The chosen orbit is therefore highly elliptical and highly inclined (70 or 98 degrees depending on the launcher), and takes SMILE a third of the way to the Moon at apogee (an altitude of 121 182 km, i.e. 19 Earth radii or RE). This type of orbit enables SMILE to spend much of its time (about 80%, equivalent to nine months of the year) at high altitude, allowing the spacecraft to collect continuous observations for the first time during more than 40h. This orbit also limits the time spent in the high-radiation Van Allen belts, and in the two toroidal belts. SMILE will be injected into a low Earth orbit by a Vega-C launch vehicle from Kourou, French Guiana, and its propulsion module will bring the spacecraft to the nominal orbit with perigee altitude of around 5000 km.

The SMILE spacecraft consists of a platform provided by the Chinese Academy of Sciences (CAS) attached to a payload module containing nearly all of the scientific instruments and an X-band communications system, provided by ESA. The payload module will be built by Airbus. The platform is composed of a propulsion and a service module, together with the two detectors (or heads) of the ion instrument. The Mission Operations Center will be run by CAS; both organizations will jointly operate the Science Operations Center.

Instruments 
Key instruments on board the spacecraft will include:
 Soft X-ray Imager (SXI) – wide-field lobster-eye telescope using micropore optics to spectrally map the location, shape, and motion of Earth's magnetospheric boundaries, including the bow shock, magnetopause, and cusps, by observing emission from the Solar Wind Charge eXchange (SWCX) process. The SXI is equipped with two large X-ray-sensitive Charge-coupled device (CCD) detectors covering the 0.2 keV to 2.5 keV energy band, and has an optic field of view spanning 15.5° × 26.5°. This telescope is being developed, built, and will be calibrated at the University of Leicester, UK, and other institutions throughout Europe. Specific software is being developed in partnership with China's National Space Science Center. CCDs are being procured from Teledyne e2v, UK, by ESA and calibrated by The Open University, UK.
 UV Imager (UVI) – an ultraviolet camera to image Earth's northern auroral regions. It will study the connection between the processes taking place at the magnetospheric boundaries – as seen by the SXI – and those acting on the charged particles precipitating into our ionosphere. The UVI is a CMOS-based camera centred on the 160-180 nm waveband, with a 10° × 10° field of view. It will have a spatial image resolution at apogee of 150 km, and will use four thin film-coated mirrors to guide light into its detector. Temporal resolution will be up to 60s. UVI is a joint venture between the University of Calgary (Canada), the Chinese National Space Science Centre, CAS, the Polar Research Institute of China, and the Liège Space Center (CSL), Belgium.
 Light Ion Analyser (LIA) – will determine the properties and behaviour of the solar wind and magnetosheath ions under various conditions by measuring the three-dimensional velocity distribution of protons and alpha particles. It is made of two top-hat-type electrostatic analysers, each mounted on opposite side of the platform. It is capable of sampling the full 4 π three-dimensional distribution of the solar wind, and can measure ions in the energy range 0.05 to 20 keV at up 0.5 second time resolution. It is a joint venture between the Chinese National Space Science Centre, CAS, and University College London's Mullard Space Science Laboratory (UCL-MSSL), UK and LPP/CNRS/Ecole Polytechnique, France.
 Magnetometer (MAG) – will be used to determine the orientation and magnitude of the magnetic field in the solar wind and magnetosheath, and to detect any solar wind shocks or discontinuities passing over the spacecraft. Two tri-axial sensors will be mounted away from the spacecraft on a 3-m-long boom some 80 cm apart, with a corresponding electronics unit mounted on SMILE's main body. This configuration will let the MAG act as a gradiometer, and allow SMILE's background magnetic field to be accurately determined and subtracted from any measurements. MAG will measure the three components of the magnetic field in the range +/- 12800 nT. It is joint venture between the Chinese National Space Science Centre, CAS, and the Space Research Institute, Austrian Academy of Sciences.

Working groups
Several working groups have been set up to help preparing the SMILE mission including

In-situ science working group 
SMILE in-situ science working group is established to support the SMILE Team in ensuring that the mission science objectives are achieved and optimized, and in adding value to SMILE science. The in-situ SWG activity is centred on optimizing the design, the operations, calibrations planning, identifying the science objectives and opportunities of the in situ instrument package, including conjunctions with other magnetospheric space missions.

Modeling working group
The SMILE modeling working group provides the following modeling supports for the upcoming SMILE mission

1. Grand modeling challenge: MHD model comparison and SXI requirements/goals
- 
 unify the X-ray calculation method (same neutral density model, background, etc.), 
 check the model-to-model difference on Solar Wind Charge eXchange (SWCX) signals and on the boundary locations (bow shock, magnetopause, and cusp)
 provide the MHD point of view on the range of X-ray signal strength.
 provide the range of the expected boundary locations under various solar wind flux.
 give a unified voice on the science requirements and goals (how high solar wind flux is needed to find the boundaries within 0.5RE resolution for 5 mins, or 0.2 RE resolution for 1 min?)

2. Boundary tracing from SXI data
 select one exemplary simulation results to test the boundary tracing techniques. 
 test A. Jorgensen & T. Sun on magnetopause tracing method by using the SXI specification (orbit, field-of-view, backgrounds, noise, etc.) 
 test M. Collier & H. Connor on magnetopause tracing method by using the same SXI specification are visible in the soft X-rays. 
 develop new methods to derive plasma boundaries from X-ray image(s)
 prepare a programing tool for the SXI data analysis 
 develop and validate the tracing methods for other boundaries (bow shock and cusps)

3. Other science projects
 investigate if small magnetosheath signatures such as magnetosheath high speed jets are visible in the soft X-rays. 
 investigate the magnetosphere-ionosphere coupling using Soft X-ray and aurora images

Ground-based and additional science working group 
The SMILE Ground-based and Additional Science Working Group coordinates support for the mission in the solar-terrestrial physics community. Their aim is to maximise the uptake of SMILE data, and therefore maximise the science output of the mission. They will coordinate future observing campaigns with other experimental facilities, both on the ground and in space, for example by using high resolution modes for Super Dual Auroral Radar Network facilities, or with EISCAT 3D, and correlating with data from other missions flying at the time. The working group is also developing a set of tools and a visualisation facility to combine data from SMILE and supporting experiments.

The Outreach working group
The SMILE Outreach working group aims to promote SMILE and its science among the general public, amateur science societies and school pupils of any age. Members of the group are active in giving presentations illustrating the science which SMILE will produce and the impact it will have on our knowledge of solar-terrestrial interactions. They generate contacts with organisations promoting science in primary and secondary schools, particularly in socio-economical deprived areas, hold hands-on workshops and promote careers in science. The group is focusing on SMILE as a practical example of how space projects are developed, and encouraging pupils to follow its progress to launch and beyond. It also promotes international exchanges, a good example of which is the translation of the book 'Aurora and Spotty' for children (and maybe for some adults too), originally in Spanish, into Chinese.

Result highlights

2019 
 August 27 - ESA science highlight: Cluster and XMM pave the way for SMILE

Awards

2020 
 May 21 - Jennifer Carter of the University of Leicester, UK, was awarded the 2020 L'Oréal-UNESCO UK & Ireland Women in Science Physical Sciences Rising Talent award

History
Following the success of the Double Star mission, the ESA and CAS decided to jointly select, design, implement, launch and exploit the results of a space mission together for the first time. After initial workshops, a call for proposals was announced in January 2015. After a joint peer review of mission proposals, SMILE was selected as the top candidate out of 13 proposed. The SMILE mission proposal was jointly led by the University College London and the Chinese National Space Science Center. From June to November 2015, the mission entered initial studies for concept readiness, and final approval was given for the mission by the ESA Science Programme Committee in November 2015. A Request For Information (RFI) on provisions for the payload module was announced on 18 December 2015. The objective was to collect information from potential providers to assess low risk payload module requirements given stated interest in the mission, in preparation for the Invitation to Tender in 2016. The Mission System Requirements Review was completed in October 2018, and ESA Mission Adoption by the Science Programme Committee was granted in March 2019.

Selected publications

External links
 ESA SMILE website (general public): http://sci.esa.int/smile
 ESA SMILE website (Science working team): https://www.cosmos.esa.int/smile
 Chinese Academy of Sciences SMILE website: http://english.cssar.cas.cn/smile/
 UCL/Mullard Space Science Laboratory SMILE consortium website: http://www.mssl.ucl.ac.uk/SMILE/
 University of Leicester SXI website: https://www2.le.ac.uk/departments/physics/research/src/Missions/smile/soft-x-ray-imager-sxi
 SMILE modelling working group website: http://smile.alaska.edu

Earth observation satellites of the European Space Agency
Satellites of China
2025 in spaceflight
Cosmic Vision
Proposed satellites
Geospace monitoring satellites